Dejë Mountain is a mountain in northern Albania. Dejë Mountain is part of Lura-Dejes Mountain National Park since 2018. The nearest village is Macukull, in Dibër County.

See also  
 Central Mountain Range
 Geography of Albania

References 

Mountains of Albania
Geography of Dibër County